On 3 August 1979, a Constitutional Convention election was held in Kermanshahan Province constituency with plurality-at-large voting format in order to decide two seats for the Assembly for the Final Review of the Constitution.

The Islamic Republican Party and the Freedom Movement of Iran had each supported one of the winning candidates. The leader of the National Front who belonged to a local tribe was notably defeated in the constituency.

Results 

 
 
|-
|colspan="14" style="background:#E9E9E9;"|
|-
 
 
 
 
 
 
 
 
 
 
 
 
 
 
 
 

|colspan=14|
|-
|colspan=14|Source:

References

1979 elections in Iran
Kermanshah Province